The ABA NLB League 2008–09 season was the 8th season of the Liga ABA. This season saw a return to the competition system in use in 2003–04, when the Final Four Tournament was played at the end of the regular season.

A total of 14 teams from Slovenia, Montenegro, Bosnia and Herzegovina, Croatia and Serbia participated in the NLB League season: Union Olimpija, Helios, Krka, Cibona, Zagreb, Zadar, Split, Bosna, Crvena zvezda, Partizan, FMP Železnik, Hemofarm, Vojvodina, Budućnost.

There were 26 round played in the regular part of the season. The best four teams later qualified for the Final Four Tournament, which was played in Belgrade between April 16 and April 18 (Partizan, Cibona, Hemofarm, Crvena zvezda).

Partizan became the 2009 League Champion.

Team information

Venues and locations

Regular season

League table

Incident
On Tuesday, 20 January 2009 around 10:40pm at the Split Airport, Red Star Belgrade players were attacked by a group of 20 Croatian hooligans, members of Torcida Split hooligan firm, and supporters of KK Split. The attack occurred inside the airport building as the players and club staff were checking-in for the charter flight back to Belgrade after beating KK Split 62-67 earlier that night in Gripe Hall. The hooligans entered the airport building, stormed the main hall, and attacked the Red Star group with sticks, glass bottles, and rocks, before escaping out of the building using another entrance. The attack did not appear to be organized.

No serious injuries were reported except for Red Star's American shooting guard Andre Owens who got a laceration on his knee as he jumped over the check-in counter to avoid the charging hooligans.

In a press release prompted by the incident, KK Split's management distanced themselves form the behaviour of their fans, expressing regret over the incident. Club president Dino Rađa also publicly apologized.

Stats Leaders

Points

Rebounds

Assists

Ranking MVP

MVP Round by Round
{| class="wikitable sortable" style="text-align: center;"
|-
! align="center"|Round
! align="center"|Player
! align="center"|Team
! align="center"|Efficiency
|-
|1||align="left"| Ante Tomić||Zagreb||36
|-
|2||align="left"| Vladan Vukosavljević||Hemofarm||39
|-
|3||align="left"| Miroslav Raduljica ||FMP||37
|-
|4||align="left"| Dejan Borovnjak ||Vojvodina||29
|-
|5||align="left"| Vladimir Golubović||Olimpija||35
|-
|6||align="left"| Ante Tomić ||Zagreb||35
|-
|7||align="left"| Ante Tomić ||Zagreb||32
|-
|8||align="left"| Dejan Borovnjak||Vojvodina||34
|-
|9||align="left"| Antonio Grant||Split||31
|-
|10||align="left"| Ante Tomić ||Zagreb||32
|-
|11||align="left"| Richard Shields||Krka || 32
|-
|12||align="left"| Marko Kešelj||Crvena zvezda || 33
|-
|13||align="left"| Dragan Labović||FMP || 32
|-
|14||align="left"| Novica Veličković||Partizan || 40
|-
|15||align="left"| Rok Stipčević||Zadar || 35
|-
|16||align="left"| Dragan Labović ||FMP || 30
|-
|17||align="left"| Alan Anderson||Cibona || 38
|-
|18||align="left"| Nicholas Jacobson||Helios || 37
|-
|19||align="left"| Lorinza Harrington||Olimpija || 34
|-
|20||align="left"| Eddie Shannon||Split || 34
|-
|21||align="left"| Ante Tomić ||Zagreb || 32
|-
|22||align="left"| Stefan Marković||Hemofarm || 33
|-
|23||align="left"| Charron Fisher||Vojvodina || 31
|-
|24||align="left"| Charron Fisher ||Vojvodina || 37
|-
|25||align="left"| Jovo Stanojević||Vojvodina || 36
|-
|26||align="left"| Dragan Labović ||FMP || 26
|-
|27||align="left"| Alan Anderson ||Cibona || 27
|-
|28||align="left"| Novica Veličković ||Partizan || 22
|-

Final four
Matches played in, Belgrade, Serbia

Semifinals

Partizan vs. Crvena zvezda

Cibona vs. Hemofarm STADA

Final

References

2008–09
2008–09 in European basketball leagues
2008–09 in Serbian basketball
2008–09 in Slovenian basketball
2008–09 in Croatian basketball
2008–09 in Bosnia and Herzegovina basketball